John Barber (8 January 1901 – 30 March 1961) was an English footballer who played as a central defender for Clayton, Southport, Manchester United, Rochdale, Stockport County and Bacup Borough.

References

External links
MUFCInfo.com profile

1901 births
1961 deaths
English footballers
Association football central defenders
Halifax Town A.F.C. players
Southport F.C. players
Manchester United F.C. players
Footballers from Salford
Rochdale A.F.C. players
Stockport County F.C. players
Hull City A.F.C. players
Bacup Borough F.C. players